Regina Dominican is a college preparatory Catholic school for girls grades 9-12, located in Wilmette, Illinois.

History
Regina Dominican was founded in 1958 by the Adrian Dominican Sisters, at the request of Cardinal Samuel Stritch.  The school was named it in honor of the Virgin Mary and St. Dominic, who was the founder of the Order of Preachers. The school was officially opened in September 1958 with 64 sophomores and 200 freshmen. Sister Mary Kevin Campbell was the first principal of the new high school.

Accreditation and awards
Regina Dominican is a member of the Dominican Association of Secondary Schools and the National Association for College Admission Counseling (NACAC). The school subscribes to the NACAC Statement of Principles of Good Practice, and is accredited by AdvancED and the Illinois State Board of Education. Eighty-four percent of Regina Dominican’s faculty have earned advanced degrees, or are in the process. As of 2019, the student-to-faculty ratio was 10:1.

In 2012, Regina was recognized with an Edison Award Silver Medal in the category of living, working, and learning environments for its approach to education that prepares young women for global leadership.  Regina Dominican has been recognized by the United States Department of Education as a Blue Ribbon School of Excellence in 2017 and 2018, and is listed among the top 2% of the nation's schools. Niche ranks Regina as the 3rd best all-girls high school in Illinois.

Academics
The school offers a rigorous STEAM and liberal arts education, including the arts, as well as courses in theology. Incoming students must pass the High School Proficiency Assessment exam.

Regina's Class of 2021 boasted a 100% college acceptance rate, with 91% of graduates being accepted to their first college of choice and 46% choosing a college major in STEM.

Extracurricular activities

Clubs
The school offers more than 26 clubs, including Mathletes, Dominican Preachers, Art Club, Green Paw Environmental Club, Photography Club, the Orchesis Dance Ensemble, and more.

Athletics
Regina Dominican has one of the largest all-girls athletic programs in the state. The school offers 11 competitive sports, and student athletes are part of the Independent School League (ISL) and IHSA Conference. Interscholastic sport teams include cheerleading, cross country running, golf, swimming, tennis, volleyball, basketball, bowling, lacrosse, soccer, softball, and track and field.

References

External links
 Official website

1958 establishments in Illinois
Buildings and structures in Wilmette, Illinois
Dominican schools in the United States
Educational institutions established in 1958
Girls' schools in Illinois
Private high schools in Cook County, Illinois
Roman Catholic Archdiocese of Chicago
Catholic secondary schools in Illinois